Charles Saunders (1922–1996), gaelicised as Cathal Ó Sándair, was one of the most prolific Irish language authors of the 20th century.

Biography
Charles Saunders was born in Weston-super-Mare, England to an English father named Simon Saunders and Irish mother. His family moved to Ireland when he was a child.  His uncle was a professional boxer named Darky Saunders, who once fought Jimmy Wilde. While still a school boy, Ó Sandair published a story in the first issue of the magazine Gael Óg in 1938. His first novel appeared in 1943 and featured Réics Carló, the most famous Irish language detective. In addition to the many adventures of Réics Carló, Ó Sándair wrote a series of novels featuring the character Réamonn Óg. A third strand of his fiction centered on school adventures where boys and girls inevitably save the day. Ó Sándair is reputed to have published 160 books and sold more than 500,000 copies. Also, he wrote a science fiction series about the space-pilot Captain Spéirling, which had certain similarities with Dan Dare.

Partial bibliography
Published by An Gúm
Na Mairbh a d’Fhill (1943)
An tEiteallán Do-Fheicthe (1943)
Tríocha Píosa Airgid (1943)
Jacko agus Sgéalta Eile (1943)
An Corpán sa Trúnc (1944)
Dúnṃharbhú i bPáirc an Chrócaigh (1944)
Uathbhás i mBrugh na Bóinne (1944)
An Gluaisteán Sidhe (1945)
Súile an Iodhail (1945)
An Lá Geal (1945)
An Chathair Seo 'Gainne (Ocht ngearr-scéal) (1947)
Soir ón Rio Grande (1949)
Réics Carló ar an nGealaigh (1950)
Réics Carló san Aifric (1951)
Réics Carló ar Dhá Eachtra eile (Réics Carlo ar Mhars & Dúnmharú ar an gCanáil) (1951)
Réics Carló san Éigipt (1951)
Bealach an Ghunna (1951)
Buachaillí Chluain Éanna (1952)
Réics Carló i gCairlinn  (1952)
Réics Carló i bPáris  (1952)
John Joe (1952)
Cás-Leabhar Réics Carló (1952)
An Buachaill Bán (1952)
Cailiní Chluain Éanna (1952)
Réamonn Óg ar an Rio Grande (1952)
Fir an Iarthair Fhiain (1952)
Réics Carló ó Sráid Fhearchair (1952)
Cluain Éanna go Bráth (1953)
Cluain Éanna Arís (1953)
Iníon an Iarthair (1953)
Réics Carló sa tSín (1953)
Micilín (1953)
An Triú Adambhomba (1953)
Réics Carló agus an Maisín Fé-Thalamh (1953)
An Bóthar go Cuailgne (1953)
Réics Carló sa Bhreasail (1953)
Bliain ón mBás (1953)
Réics Carló sna Stáit Aontaithe (1953)
An Stróinséir ó Théacsas (1953)
An tIndiach ó Éirinn (1953)
Réics Carló agus Rún an Iarnróid Dúnta (1953)
Réics Carló agus Cás an Amhránaí Sráide (1953)
Réics Carló agus an Cró-Dheamhan (1954)
Réics Carló i Londain (1954)
Cuir Fios ar Réics Carló (1954)
Réamonn Óg, Sirriam (1954)
Réics Carló agus Ridire an Chaisleáin Duibh (1954)
Réics Carló agus Mistéire na nÉan gan Sciatháin (1954)
Uafás i gCluain Éanna (1954)
Réamonn Óg Arís (1954)
Réamonn Óg ar a Choimeád (1954)
Cailíní Chluain Éanna agus Fear an Chlóca Dhuibh (1954)
Buachaillí Chluain Éanna agus an Spiaire ón Spéir (1954)
Réics Carló, Taighdeálaí Príobháideach (1954)
Réamonn Óg i nGleann an Bháis (1954)
Réamonn Óg, Cara na nIndiach (1955)
Réics Carló i Meicsicó (1955)
Cluain Éanna Arís (1955)
Réics Carló agus Mistéire an Chuain (1955)
Mistéir na Scoile ar Muir (1955)
Réics Carló agus an Mhaidhm Bháite (1955)
Réics Carló agus Cás an Cháilín Fhuadaithe (1955)
Réics Carló i bPort Láirge (1955)
Réics Carló agus Cás an Mhilliúnaí Mhairbh (1955)
Réics Carló agus Mistéire na Loinge Sí (1955)
Faoi Bhratach an Bháis (1955)
Sorcha Ghlionnáin agus Ballaí Indreabháín (1955)
Réamonn Óg agus Díoltas an Indiaigh (1955)
Cuir Fios ar Réamonn Óg (1955)
Réamonn Óg ó Lodestone (1955)
Buachaillí Chluain Éanna agus an Mac Léinn is Raimhre ar Bith (1955)
Réics Carló i nDún na nGall (1956)
Réics Carló i gContae Mhuineacháin (1956)
Réics Carló i nDún Dealgán (1956)
Réics Carló agus Mistéire an Oileáin (1956)
Réics Carló i gContae Chill Mantáin (1956)
An tSeamhróigín Dhilís (1956)
An Sean-Siopa Dorcha (1956)
Réamonn Óg agus Indiagh ar an Teorainn (1956)
Cuir Fios ar Scorach Ghlionnáin (1956)
Réamonn Óg agus Rí an Mhachaire (1956)
An Captaen Toirneach ar an Meánmhuir (1956)
An Captaen Toirneach ar Eachtra Eile (1956)
Mo Chara, mo Namhaid (1967)
Captaen Toirneach agus Ór-Thaisce na Spáínnach (1956)
Réics Carló i gCorcaigh (1956)
Réamonn Óg agus Marcaigh na hOíche (1957)
Réamonn Óg agus Éirí-Amach na nIndiach (1957)
Réamonn Óg agus Marcaigh Ghleann an Bháis (1957)
Réics Carló Arís (1957)
Scorach Ghlionnáin ó Chonamara (1957)
An Captaen Toirneach Arís (1957)
Réics Carló agus an Fear do bhí Ró-Saibhir (1957)
An Chéad Bhliain i gCluain Éanna (1959)
Faoi Sheol leis an gCaptaen Toirneach (1959)
Réamonn Óg, Sirriam gan Eagla (1959)
Réamonn Óg agus an tÓr-Mhianach Caillte (1959)
Díoltas Réamonn Óg (1959)
Réamonn Óg agus an Marcach Dubh (1960)
Le Columbus go Meiriceá (1960)
Réamonn Óg agus Ór an Sprionlóra (1960)
An Captaen Spéirling agus an Plainéad do Phléasc (1960)
Réamonn Óg, Namhaid na mBithúnach (1960)
Réamonn Óg an Bó-bhuachaill Bómanta (1960)
Eachtraí Buachaillí Chluain Éanna (1960)
An Captaen Spéirling Arís (1960)
Leis an gCaptaen Spéirling go Mars (1961)
Eachtra Dheireannach Réamonn Óig (1961)
An Sean-Siopa Dorcha (1961)
Captaen Spéirling, Spás-Phíolóta (1962)
An Campa sna Sléibhte (1962)
Íobairt Sheáin (1962)
An Príosúnach (1962)
Prionsa, Rí na Madraí (1963)
Mo Chara, mo Namhaid (1964)
Ar Son a Charad (1964)
Mo Mhadra Prionsa (1964)
Rún m’Athar (1964)
An Clódóir Óg (1964)
Mo Ghaiscíoch, Micheál (1965)
Prionsa an tSléibhe (1965)
Prionsa Arís (1965)
Uafás I mBrú na Bóinne (1970) Reprint
An Glór Glé Glinn Fadó (1980)
Fáilte ar Ais, a Réics (1981)
Réics Carló ar Oileán Mhanainn (1984)

An Glór Glé Glinn Fadó, Foilseachain Abhair Spioradalta (FS), Baile Átha Cliath, 1980

Reks Carlo Ayns Mannin (Manx translation of Réics Carló ar Oileán Mhanainn), Yn Çheshaght Ghailckagh, Peel, 2006

In English as Cahill O'Sandair

Introducing Ambrose, Catholic Truth Society of Ireland, Dublin, 1950
Ambrose and the Parrot, Irish Messenger Office, Dublin, 1951
Ambrose and the Phantom, Irish Messenger Office, Dublin, 1951
Pat Sees the Truth, Irish Messenger Office, Dublin, 1951

In English As Desmond Reid

Bullets are Trumps, Amalgamated Press, London, 1961 (Sexton Blake Library #488)

References

External links
Official site

1922 births
1996 deaths
Irish-language writers
People from Weston-super-Mare
Irish science fiction writers
20th-century Irish people
21st-century Irish people